Dragan Talajić (born 25 August 1965) is a Croatian former footballer who is a Technical Director of Bahrain Football Association. Talajić played as a goalkeeper and is a football manager who has managed many clubs in Middle East, Thailand and China. He is the winning coach of the 2004 AFC Champions League with Al-Ittihad. For the 2010–11 season Talajić was declared Best Coach of Asia and Best Coach of Arabic football world by television Al Jazeera Sport TV, Best Coach of Arabic football world by MBC Sport TV and Best Coach of Jordan by votes of fans and press. In Croatia Football Federation-HNS, Talajić is regarded as the prodigy of the Most successful manager in history by La Gazzetta dello Sport, Tomislav Ivić.

Club career
Talajić had a spell with Zeytinburnuspor in the Turkish Süper Lig during the 1994–95 season. Dragan started in FK Sarajevo and was one of the brightest young talents of Yugoslav football. As a junior player for FK Sarajevo, Dragan Talajić broke the record of the great Yugoslav goalkeeper Slobodan Janjuš by having received only one goal in the whole season. During the 1992–93 season Talajić was a part of a historic Slovenian football story having played a UEFA Cup match against Benfica for Slovenian side Belvedur Izola. His performance in UEFA Cup, despite having conceded 8 goals in the UEFA competition, led to a transfer to Turkish Süper Lig. He played in Turkey for two seasons. After a short spell with NK Orijent in Croatia's Prva HNL, from 1997 to the end of his career Talajić played for Tanjong Pagar United FC in Singapore's S-League. Talajić left a big mark in Singaporean football since he was twice selected as the player of the year.

Career as manager

Al Ittihad
Talajić won the 2004 AFC Champions League as manager of Saudi club Al-Ittihad. He won 0–5 in Korea which is the biggest win in Asian Champions League final in the history of Asian football. It was Al Ittihad first Asian Champions League trophy in their history. It is till this day the biggest score in any AFC Champions League final, making Dragan Talajic the only coach in Asian history to win a final with five goals. He left the club within 6 months.

Riffa Club & Al-Nahda
He led Al Riffa from Bahrain to the finals stage of the Gulf Cup in 2005–2006. Talajić led Saudi club Al Nahda to the final of the Prince Faisal Cup 2007/2008 entering in the history of Saudi football as the first team from the second league to play the finals of Prince Faisal Cup.

Shabab Al-Ordon
In the 2009–10 season, Talajić was the coach of Shabab Al-Ordon (Jordan Youth Club) from Amman, Jordan. He led his team to a victory in AFC Cup in Yemen against Al-Ahli Sana'a', drew both home and away against Al-Karmah from Syria, then drew in Oman against Saham and won against Saham in Jordan and qualified to the next round of the AFC Cup, thanks to a win in Jordan against Al-Ahli Sana'a by 6–1.

Al-Wahdat
For the season 2010–2011, Talajić is the head coach of the biggest Jordanian side Al-Wahdat from Amman. His remarkable trophy run began on 6 August 2010 when Talajić won his first trophy of the season with Al-Wahdat winning 2–0 in the finals of the Jordan Shield Cup.

On 13 August 2010, Talajić won the Jordan Super Cup against Al-Wahdat's bitter rival Al-Faisaly. The title win was 10th Super Cup trophy that Al-Wahdat has won in the club's history.

At the end of the season, 2010-2011 Talajic's Al-Wahdat finished first winning the Jordan League with 17 point difference between them and Al-Faisaly who finished second. Talajić's Al-Wahdat finished end of the season with 16 wins, 3 draws and 1 loss. Including their fixtures in the AFC Cup, where they are through to the quarter-finals, they have won 32 of their 39 games, drawn six and lost just one. In the process, they have racked up 82 goals and conceded just 23. Talajić made a remarkable run with 46 games without defeat.

On 21 May, Talajić won the Jordan League Cup as his fourth trophy of the season becoming the first coach in history to win all 4 trophies in one season.

Kuwait SC
In July 2011, Talajić signed a one-year contract with Kuwait SC club from Kuwait. Talajić was brought to Kuwait SC after his remarkable run with Al Wahdat in the season 2010–2011. Talajić led his club to victory at home against Muangthong United winning by 1–0. In Thailand the score was 0-0 and Kuwait SC qualified to the semi-finals of the AFC Cup. Talajić was dismissed in the 65' minute in Thailand after entering the pitch to protest to the referee for his disgraceful performance after the Thai players injured 4 Kuwaiti players without receiving any cards for their dirty way of playing. Talajić was later suspended by the Asian Football Federation for one game due to his actions. In the semi-finals of AFC Cup Talajić's Kuwait SC played against Iraqi's Arbil FC. Kuwait won in Iraq with the result 2-0 and played in Kuwait 3–3 to qualify to the AFC Cup Finals. Their opponent in the finals was FC Nasaf Qarshi from Uzbekistan. The finals were played at Qarshi Stadium located in Qarshi, Uzbekistan. FC Nasaf Qarshi had to their advantage the home stadium and fans which led to a hell of an atmosphere for Talajić's team. The game ended with 2-1 for FC Nasaf Qarshi.
On 18 December, Dragan Talajić won the Kuwait Federation Cup beating in the finals Kazma with the result 4–3, in the 50th minute the score was 0–3 in favor of Kazma SC, but Talajić brought in two substitutes and changed the course of the game making the Kuwait Federation Cup finals 2011 more than spectacular. On 8 March 12, Dragan parted ways with the club.

Ittihad Kalba
He was the coach of Ittihad Kalba for a very short period of time. During his time with Ittihad Kalba he had to face many big defeats from the giants of UAE Arabian Gulf League. He managed the club for 6 matches, with bad results and Talajic just couldn't find the same language and vision with the club boss, Dragan Talajic left the club with a mutual agreement with the club.

Dhofar
In June 2013, the Omani club Dhofar appointed him as their coach. Dragan was in charge of Omani giant Dhofar who won Oman Professional League record 9 times. He continued the tradition of Dhofar being the biggest club in Sultanate of Oman.

Muangthong United
On 2 July 2014, Muangthong United have announced that they have signed Talajić as their head coach on a 3-year contract. On 30 July Talajić led Muangthong United to a 1–1 draw against La Liga side UD Almeria of Spain. Talajić led the club to the 2nd place in Thai Premier League, 2nd place in Thai FA Cup and the qualification for the Asian Champions League 2016. On 19 January 2016 the agreement was reached between Coach Dragan and the Board to end the contract with the club. Dragan Talajic left the club with 60% wins on a period of two seasons.

Al Faisaly
On 19 September 2017, Talajić took helm of the most successful Jordanian football club, 2 times AFC Cup Champion, 19 times Jordan FA Cup Champion, 16 times Jordan Super Cup Champion, 7 times Jordan FA Shield Champion and 33 times Jordan League Champion Al-Faisaly.

Henan Jianye
On 18 December 2017, Talajić was appointed as the Head Coach of Henan Jianye of the Chinese Super League. On 11 March 2018, Talajić led Henan Jianye to a 1–0 victory against a favored side of coach Uli Stielike, Tianjin Teda, which is a jubilee 300th victory of Henan Jianye in Chinese Super League history. On 21 April 2018 after seven matches. Dragan Talajic parted company with Henan due to the club not being able to follow his attacking philosophy. He was a part of the coaching elite of Chinese Super League 2018 among coaches as: Fabio Capello, Bernd Schuster, Manuel Pellegrini, Paulo Sousa, Dragan Stojkovic, Vitor Pereira and Fabio Cannavaro.

Al Khaldiya SC Bahrain
On 10 December 2021, Talajić was appointed as the Head Coach of Al Khaldiya SC of the Bahraini Premier League. Al Khaldiya is a football club established in Bahrain by the Bahrain Royal Family in 2020. It is the newest Bahrain club but the most ambitious and financially the strongest Bahrain football team. With huge ambitions of the football club, Talajić was appointed as the Head Coach and more than nine Bahrain National Team players were brought to the club. Talajić started on the best way, beating Al Muharraq the 35 times Bahrain Football Champion and two times AFC Asian Cup Champions in Bahrain Federation Cup. On 10 February 2022, Talajić took Al Khaldiya's side to the King of Bahrain Cup 2022 Final for the first time in the club's history. On 5 March 2022, Talajić won Bahraini King's Cup for the first time in clubs history.

Managerial statistic

 A win or loss by the penalty shoot-out is counted as the draw in time.

Achievements as manager

Honors
With Al Ittihad
AFC Champions League Winner (1): 2004

With Bahrain Riffa
GCC Champions League 2005/2006: Runner Up

With Al Nahda
 Saudi Federation cup (Prince Faisal Bin Fahad Cup) Official 2007/2008 : Runner Up

With Al-Wahdat
Jordan FA Shield Winner (1): 2010
Jordan Super Cup Winner (1): 2011
Jordan League Winner (1): 2010–11
Jordan FA Cup Winner (1): 2010–11

With Al Kuwait
Kuwait Federation Cup Winner (1): 2011–12
AFC Cup Runner up (1): 2011

With Muangthong United
Thai Premier League 2015: Runner-up
Thai FA Cup 2015: Runner-up

With Al Khaldiya
Bahraini King's Cup 2022: Winner

Declarations
 Best Coach of Asia 2010-2011 (Al Jazeera Sport TV)
 Best Coach of Arabic football world 2010-2011 (Al Jazeera Sport TV & MBC Sport TV)
 Best Coach of Jordan 2010-2011 (Votes of people and Press)
 Best Manager of the Month 2015 Thai League T1

Performances
 AFC Cup: 2 (with 3 clubs)
Round of 16 2009  Shabab Al Ordon Take-over of Al-Wahdat
Round of 16 2010  Al-Wahdat Take-over of Al Kuwait

References

External links
 Dragan Talajic Interview

1965 births
Living people
Yugoslav footballers
Croatian footballers
Association football goalkeepers
Croatian football managers
FK Sarajevo players
HNK Orijent players
Croatian Football League players
Zeytinburnuspor footballers
Süper Lig players
Tanjong Pagar United FC players
Singapore Premier League players
Croatian expatriate footballers
Croatian expatriate sportspeople in Slovenia
Expatriate footballers in Slovenia
Expatriate footballers in Turkey
Croatian expatriate sportspeople in Turkey
Expatriate footballers in Singapore
Croatian expatriate sportspeople in Singapore
Ittihad FC managers
East Riffa Club managers
Al-Nahda Club (Saudi Arabia) managers
Kuwait SC managers
Dragan Talajic
Al-Wehdat SC managers
Henan Songshan Longmen F.C. managers
Expatriate football managers in Bahrain
Croatian expatriate sportspeople in Bahrain
Expatriate football managers in the United Arab Emirates
Croatian expatriate sportspeople in the United Arab Emirates
Expatriate football managers in Oman
Croatian expatriate sportspeople in Oman
Expatriate football managers in Jordan
Croatian expatriate sportspeople in Jordan
Expatriate football managers in Saudi Arabia
Croatian expatriate sportspeople in Saudi Arabia
Expatriate football managers in Kuwait
Croatian expatriate sportspeople in Kuwait
Expatriate football managers in Thailand
Croatian expatriate sportspeople in Thailand
Expatriate football managers in China
Croatian expatriate sportspeople in China
Al-Faisaly SC managers
Chinese Super League managers
Kuwait Premier League managers
Dhofar Club managers
Al-Ta'ee managers
Saudi First Division League managers
Al-Ittihad Kalba SC managers